Sarcandra glabra is an herb native to Southeast Asia. It is also known as herba sarcandrae or glabrous sarcandra herb. Its common names include the nine-knotted flower and the bone-knitted lotus.

Aromatic oils may be extracted from the leaves. This extract has been shown in mice to reduce immunologic attenuation due to stress.

Morphology

Leaf blade elliptic or ovate-lanceolate, 6–17 × 2–6 cm, leathery, margin sharply coarsely-serrate. Stamen baculate to terete; thecae shorter than connective. Stigma subcapitate. Fruit globose or ovoid, 3–4 mm in diam.

Distribution

The plant is distributed in Vietnam, Sri Lanka, Taiwan, Cambodia, Malaysia, India, Japan, Korea, the Philippines and, in China, Jiangxi, Anhui, Fujian, Guizhou, Guangxi, Hunan, Sichuan, Yunnan, Guangdong, Zhejiang and other places, growing at an altitude of 420 meters to 1,500 meters, often growing on wet slopes and in shaded valleys.

Use in Japanese culture 
The plant is called Senryō (千両) in Japanese. It is used during Japanese New Year for chabana decoration, normally along winter jasmine. Others plants used instead of Sarcandra glabra because of its similarity to it are coralberry trees and Ardisia japonica.

References

Chloranthaceae
Medicinal plants
Plants used in traditional Chinese medicine